Koreasat is a series of South Korean communications satellites operated by KT SAT, a subsidiary of KT Corporation.

Satellites

References

Communications satellites
Satellites of South Korea